The 1918 Clemson Tigers football team represented Clemson Agricultural College—now known as Clemson University—as a member of the Southern Intercollegiate Athletic Association (SIAA) during the 1918 college football season. Under second-year head coach Edward Donahue, the team posted an overall record of 5–2 with a mark of 3–1 in SIAA play. Stumpy Banks was the team captain.

Schedule

References

Clemson
Clemson Tigers football seasons
Clemson Tigers football